Graphis, Inc. is an international publisher of books and awards for the visual communications industry. Based in New York City, Graphis presents and promotes the best submitted work in Graphic Design, Advertising, Photography and Art/Illustration. Graphis award competitions are juried by award-winning leading creatives and include: Graphic Design, Advertising, Photography, Posters, New Talent (Student), Packaging and Protest Posters. The award-winning work is published online and in fine art quality hardbound books.

Other Graphis books include: Takenobu Igarashi: Design and Fine Art, Ally & Gargano, and Nudes which is a collection of fine art photographs of the human form, amongst many others. Graphis also publishes a New Talent Annual that presents the best student work of the year, providing young professionals exposure and recognition. Graphis Magazine ended at issue #355, and a new Graphis Journal magazine, starting with Issue #356, was introduced in 2017. The Graphis Journal presents stories on the top talents who have been consistent Platinum and Gold winners in the Graphis annual competitions.

History
Graphis was founded in 1944 by Walter Herdeg and Dr. Walter Amstutz in Zurich, Switzerland. The magazine was started with the September/October 1944 issue. In 1986, B. Martin Pedersen purchased the company from Mr. Herdeg and later moved the headquarters to New York City. The Annuals were redefined and new books were added to the roster, including New Talent (student work), Typography, Branding, Logo & Letterhead, amongst others.

Awards
Graphis annually invites professionals across the design industry communities to enter. Amongst these submissions, Graphis selects the most compelling work of the year for Platinum, Gold, and Silver awards considerations, which are featured in hardcover Annuals and on the website. In addition, Honorable Mentions are also archived permanently on Graphis' website. Up to 500 submissions are published and presented on the site, supporting professionals, as well as young and emerging talent.

Graphis Masters

Design
 Balog, James
 Bass, Saul
 Castelletti, Andrea
 Fili, Louise
 Fletcher, Alan
 Frost, Vince
 Gericke, Michael
 Glaser, Milton
 Goldberg, Carin
 Hillman, David
 Hinrichs, Kit
 Lloyd, Doug
 Lubalin, Herb
 McCandliss and Campbell
 Miyake, Issey
 Nygaard, Finn
 Porsche, F.A.
 Rand, Paul
 Sagmeister, Stefan
 Saito, Makoto
 Satoh, Taku
 Throndsen, Morten
 Scher, Paula
 Schwab, Michael
 Stavro, Astrid (Atlas)
 Tanaka, Ikko
 Vanderbyl, Michael
 Vignelli, Lella
 Vignelli, Massimo
 Woodward, Fred

Photography
 Diodato, Bill
 O'Brien, Michael
 Robert, Francois
 Schatz, Howard
 Laurie Frankel
 Terry Heffernan
 Turner, Pete
 Watson, Albert
 Zuckerman, Andrew

Advertising
 Krone, Helmut
 Ogilvy, David
 Volkswagen
 DeVito, Sal
 Fallon, Pat
 Lloyd, Doug

Art/Illustration
 Larsson, Carl
 Billout, Guy
 Blackshear, Thomas
 Vasarely, Victor
 Wyeth, N.C.

Art
 Flagg, James M.
 Stahl, Nancy
 Unruh, Jack
 Parrish, Maxfield
 Rockwell, Norman
 Rodriguez, Robert

Schools
 DeVito, Sal

References

External links
 
 2009 Design Annual Platinum Award Winners
 2022 Poster Annual Award Winners
 2021 Design Annual Award Winners
 2021 Advertising Annual Award Winners

1944 establishments in Switzerland
Advertising awards
Book art awards
Book design
Book publishing companies based in New York City
Communication design
Design awards
Design books
Design magazines
Graphic design
Magazines established in 1944
Magazines published in Zürich
Photography book cover images
Photography awards
Publishing companies based in New York City
Publisher awards
Visual arts magazines published in the United States